Dino Dana is a Canadian television series that was created and is directed by J. J. Johnson. The series was developed as a followup to Dino Dan: Trek's Adventures and premiered on Amazon Prime on May 27, 2017. In September 2020, Dino Dana: The Movie was released on Prime Video after being announced in 2018. It was originally going to be a theatrical release on March 21, 2020, but was delayed and later cancelled due to the COVID-19 pandemic in Canada. The final episodes were released in April 2020, with the franchise closing off with the feature-length film.

Plot 
A sequel series to Dino Dan, Dino Dana focuses on a nine-year-old girl named Dana Jain who sets out to complete "Dino experiments" that teach her more about dinosaurs, pterosaurs, prehistoric marine reptiles, synapsids, prehistoric insects and prehistoric mammals. She often also increases her understanding of life and grows in her personal life as a result of the lessons learned while solving the experiments. Other characters include her older stepsister, Saara; her mother, Ava; her stepfather, Ahman; and Gloria, her maternal grandmother, and Dexter, her baby half-brother born at the beginning of season 3. Jason Spevack and Trek Buccino also make periodic guest appearances as Dan and Trek Henderson.

The series combines live action with CGI animation.

Cast 

 Michela Luci as Dana Jain
 Saara Chaudry as Saara Jain, Dana's older step-sister
 Nicola Correia-Damude as Mom (Eva Jain)
 Amish Patel as Dad (Aman Jain)
 Rayan Mahklouf as Dexter Jain, Dana and Saara’s baby brother
 Maria Vacratsis as Grandma
 Eric Peterson as Grandpa
 Ali Hassan as Uncle Ravi
 Nelu Handa as Anjali, Uncle Ravi’s girlfriend
 Bill Cobbs as Mr. Hendrickson, Dana's neighbour
 Laaibah Alvi as Young Saara
 Loretta Yu as Cai (recurring)
 Anna Cathcart as Robyn (recurring)
 Olivia Presti as Olivia (recurring)
 Millie Davis as Riley (recurring)
 Jayne Eastwood as Ms Currie
 Jason Spevack as Dan Henderson
 Trek Buccino as Trek Henderson

Broadcast

Episodes

Awards 

2017: won the Kidscreen Award for Best New Series 

2018: won the Kidscreen Award for Best Non-Animated or Mixed Series 

2019: won the Daytime Emmy Award for Best Performer in a Children's Program

2019: won the 2019 YMA Award for Best Program, Live Action Scripted and Non-Scripted, Preschool

Broadcast 
On October 6, 2016, on YouTube, short introductory Dino Dana clips were first published, reusing footage from the past two shows. Dino Dana premiered on May 26, 2017 on Amazon Prime in the US and UK. In Canada, TVO Kids picked up the show in June 2017. In Australia Dino Dana screens on ABC Kids. In Latin America, premiered on Nat Geo Kids Latin America

References

External links 
 Dino Dana on IMDb
 Dino Dana on ABC iView

2010s Canadian children's television series
2020s Canadian children's television series
2017 Canadian television series debuts
Canadian preschool education television series
Canadian television series with live action and animation
Canadian television spin-offs
2010s preschool education television series
2020s preschool education television series
Television series about children
Television series about dinosaurs
Television shows filmed in Toronto
TVO original programming
Amazon Prime Video children's programming
English-language television shows